Peter James Berezney (November 14, 1923 – October 13, 2008) was an American football tackle who played two seasons in the All-America Football Conference with the Los Angeles Dons and Baltimore Colts. He was drafted by the Detroit Lions in the seventh round of the 1946 NFL Draft. He played college football at the University of Notre Dame and attended William L. Dickinson High School in Jersey City, New Jersey.

College career
Berezney played for he Notre Dame Fighting Irish from 1943 to 1945. He was a starter his senior year in 1945.

Professional career
Berezney played in twelve games, starting three, for the Los Angeles Dons in 1947. He played in thirteen games for the Baltimore Colts during the 1948 season.

Personal life
Berezney's brother Paul played in the National Football League and AAFC. Pete's brother Steve wrote a book on their family, titled after their father Pete, called "Sugarhouse Pete: An American Family Story".

References

External links
Just Sports Stats

1923 births
2008 deaths
Players of American football from Jersey City, New Jersey
American football tackles
Notre Dame Fighting Irish football players
Los Angeles Dons players
Baltimore Colts (1947–1950) players
William L. Dickinson High School alumni